is a Prefectural Natural Park in Ehime Prefecture, Japan. Established in 1960, the park spans the borders of the municipalities of Ōzu and Seiyo. The park's central feature is the eponymous .

See also
 National Parks of Japan

References

External links
  Detailed map of Hijikawa Prefectural Natural Park

Parks and gardens in Ehime Prefecture
Ōzu, Ehime
Seiyo, Ehime
Protected areas established in 1960
1960 establishments in Japan